Frederic Walker Lincoln Jr. (February 27, 1817 – September 12, 1898)  was an American manufacturer and politician, serving as the sixteenth and eighteenth mayor of Boston, Massachusetts from 1858 to 1860 and 1863–1867, respectively.

Frederick Douglass criticized him for not protecting, with city police, a December 1860 public meeting in Boston to discuss abolitionism.  The meeting was broken up by a pro-slavery mob. On July 14, 1863, Lincoln ordered all 330 officers in the Boston Police Department to quell a draft riot among Irish Catholics attempting to raid Union armories in the North End.

He elected a 3rd Class (honorary) Companion of the Massachusetts Commandery of the Military Order of the Loyal Legion of the United States in recognition of his support of the Union during the American Civil War.

Family 
Lincoln was the grandfather of Frederic W. Lincoln IV.

See also
 Timeline of Boston, 1860s

Notes

1817 births
1898 deaths
Mayors of Boston
Republican Party members of the Massachusetts House of Representatives
People of Massachusetts in the American Civil War
19th-century American politicians